The Kingdom of Wallachia, named after the region of Moravian Wallachia, is a tongue-in-cheek recessionary association that was founded in 1997 by the photographer Tomáš Harabiš as an "elaborate practical joke". The location is in the southeast corner of the Czech Republic. Since foundation a reported 80,000 Czech citizens have acquired "Wallachian Passports".

After the official proclamation of the Wallachian kingdom in 1997, actor Bolek Polívka was enthroned as King Boleslav I the Gracious with his coronation occurring at a lavish ceremony in 2000. The "Government" led by Tomáš Harabiš established state institutions and issued passports to around 80,000 officially Czech citizens. A new currency, the Jurovalsar, was launched which was pegged to the euro at a rate of 1:1. Enthusiastic attempts to forge official ties with other countries have so far proved disappointing and the Kingdom of Wallachia enjoys no formal diplomatic recognition.

Constitutional Crisis of 2001 

In 2001 the Wallachian "government" deposed King Boleslav in a palace coup, accusing the fallen monarch of behaving unconstitutionally by demanding 1,000,000 Czech koruna for his services. Unperturbed, the deposed king travelled the realm gathering support for his restoration claiming that he had actually ascended the throne in 1993 some four years before the formation of the Harabiš government, and business venture. The ex-king also claimed the idea for the kingdom was his. Unable to settle the dispute internally, the case was taken to court in 2007 in Ostrava, Czech Republic. The court ruled in favour of the "government" of Tomáš Harabiš which went on to search for a new candidate for the throne, eventually crowning Vladimír Zháněl as King Vladimír II. Since then the former king, Bolek Polívka, has appealed to the Czech High Court.

"Kings of Wallachia" 
 Boleslav I, 1997–2001 (deposed). The start of Boleslav's reign is disputed, with the former monarch claiming it began in 1993.
 Vladimír II, 2001–present.

References

External links
A Radio Praha article on the succession dispute
Coup in fantasy kingdom inside Czech Republic, The Independent, 13 October 2008

Tourist attractions in the Czech Republic
Wallachia
States and territories established in 1997